A Month of Sundays may refer to:

Literature
A Month of Sundays (novel), part of the Scarlet Letter trilogy by John Updike
A Month of Sundays, a novel by Diane Farr

Film, theatre, and television
A Month of Sundays (2001 film), a 2001 film starring Rod Steiger
A Month of Sundays (2015 film), a 2015 film
A Month of Sundays (miniseries), a 1981 Canadian film anthology miniseries
A Month of Sundays (play), a comedy by Bob Larbey, later adapted by Larbey as the 1989 television movie Age-Old Friends
"A Month of Sundays", a second-season episode of the American television series Route 66
A Month of Sundays, a play by Romeo Muller

Music
Albums and EPs
 A Month of Sundays, a 1993 album by Canadian folk rock band Jimmy George
 A Month of Sundays, a 1996 solo album from Tony Hooper, best known as member of the Strawbs
A Month of Sundays, a 2019 album by American duo Epignosis

Songs
 "A Month of Sundays", a 1984 single by Scottish pop band The Questions
 "A Month of Sundays", a 1991 song and music video by Vern Gosdin
 "A Month of Sundays", a 1984 song by Don Henley from Building the Perfect Beast
 "A Month of Sundays", a 1984 song by The Church from Remote Luxury
 "A Month of Sundays", a 2010 song by Sick of it All from Based on a True Story
 "A Month of Sundays", a 2003 song by Roses are Red from Handshakes and Heartbreaks

Other uses
A Month of Sundays, an art gallery by English artist Pete McKee